Rombouts is a surname of Flemish-Dutch origin, meaning "son of Rombout". People with this name include
 Adriaen Rombouts (c. 1640 – in or after 1670), Flemish genre painter active in Brussels
 Cataryna Rombouts Brett (1687–1764), New York landowner, daughter of Francis Rombouts
  (1878–1946), Dutch Franciscan priest
 Francis Rombouts (1631–1691), Flemish-born Mayor of New York City from 1679 to 1680
 Gillis Rombouts (1630–1672), Dutch landscape painter from Haarlem
 Jan Rombouts the Elder (c.1480–1535), Flemish painter, draftsman, printmaker and glass designer
 Linda Rombouts (born 1953), Belgian speed skater
 Luc Rombouts (born 1962), Belgian carillon player
 Salomon Rombouts (1655–1702), Dutch painter, son of Gillis
 Theodoor Rombouts (1597–1637), Flemish genre painter
  (born 1979), Flemish politician
  (born 1951), Dutch politician

Companies 
 Rombouts Coffee a Flemish coffee company, founded by Frans Rombouts in 1896 which introduced a one-cup filter coffee

See also
 Rombout (disambiguation)
 Saint Rombout
 Sint-Romboutskathedraal, Mechelen, Belgium
 ,  Mechelen, Belgium

Dutch-language surnames
Patronymic surnames
Surnames of Dutch origin